Jardine Comyn, Lord of Inverallochy, also known as Jordan, was a son of William Comyn, Lord of Badenoch later the Earl of Buchan and was granted the lands of Inverallochy from his father upon William becoming the Earl of Buchan, jure uxoris of his second wife Margaret, Countess of Buchan.

Life
Jardine was a son of William Comyn, Lord of Badenoch and his first wife Sarah Fitzhugh. He received Inverallochy in Buchan from his father  William Comyn, Earl of Buchan jure uxoris in 1225, confirmed in a charter in 1277, by his half brother Alexander Comyn, Earl of Buchan.

Marriage and issue
Jardine, is known to have had the following issue:
Philip, married Marjory, the daughter of Adam Wauchope of Culter.

Citations

References
Burke, John. Burke's Genealogical and Heraldic History of the Landed Gentry, Volume 2, H. Colburn, 1847.
People of Medieval Scotland, 1093–1314 - Jordan Comyn

Year of birth unknown
Year of death unknown
13th century in Scotland
Jardine Comyn
13th-century mormaers
Peers jure uxoris
Earls or mormaers of Buchan